Luis Albino (15 October 1929 – 27 October 2006) was a Uruguayan boxer. He competed in the men's lightweight event at the 1952 Summer Olympics.

References

External links

1929 births
2006 deaths
Uruguayan male boxers
Olympic boxers of Uruguay
Boxers at the 1952 Summer Olympics
Place of birth missing
Lightweight boxers